Donna Moore (born 1962) is a Scottish novelist. Her first published book ...Go To Helena Handbasket won the 2007 Left Coast Crime Lefty Award for best humorous mystery of the year. Her second novel, Old Dogs, followed in 2010.

Novels
...Go To Helena Handbasket (2007)
Old Dogs (2010)

References

External links
Donna Moore's Blog

1962 births
Living people
Scottish women novelists
Scottish mystery writers
21st-century Scottish novelists
21st-century Scottish women writers
Women mystery writers